Ickbach  is a river of Düsseldorf, North Rhine-Westphalia, Germany.

History
Around the year 1900, this river was channeled underground.  Since it runs completely underground and is no longer listed on current maps, its exact course is unknown. It flows into the Düssel river a little south of the Mitsubishi Electric Halle.

In 2010 it was accidentally discovered during construction work.

See also
List of rivers of North Rhine-Westphalia

References

Rivers of North Rhine-Westphalia
Rivers of Germany